Barbodes lateristriga, the spanner barb or T-barb, is a species of cyprinid fish native to the Malay Peninsula and the island of Borneo.  It can reach a length of  TL.  This species can also be found in the aquarium trade.

Distribution and habitat
This species is an inhabitant of clear streams in mountain areas, particularly common at the base of waterfalls. They are native to the Malay Peninsula and Borneo. It prefers areas with plentiful boulders and rocky stream beds.

Diet
Its diet consists of such invertebrates as insects, worms and crustaceans as well as plant material.

Reproduction
The spanner barb scatters it eggs in the substrate and then abandons them.

In the aquarium
In an aquarium the spanner barb will adapt to water up to a pH of 7.2, and can live in slightly harder water than in their natural habitat.  They are a mostly peaceful fish if kept in a school of at least five fish, but their large size makes them unsuited to a community of small fish.

See also
List of freshwater aquarium fish species

References

External links
 Age of Aquariums: http://www.aquahobby.com/gallery/e_tbarb.php
 Video: https://www.youtube.com/watch?v=3XQqYeWFLN0
 Spanner Barb Fact Sheet: http://www.bettatrading.com.au/Spanner-Barb-Fact-Sheet.php

Barbodes
Barbs (fish)
Fish described in 1842